

Methodology 
The figures come from the Indonesia Human Development Report, published by Statistics Indonesia and Human Development Index (by UN Method) of Indonesian provinces since 1990 (2021 revision).

By Statistics Indonesia in 2022 
Source by statistic Indonesia published by Statistics Indonesia

Cities and regencies

List of cities of Indonesia with very high HDI (2022) 
According to BPS Indonesia 2020 data, the total population of all cities with very high HDI is 37,570,879 people.

List of regencies of Indonesia with very high HDI (2022) 
According to BPS Indonesia 2020 data, the total population of all regencies with very high HDI is 4,693,525 people.

By UNDP reports

Trends by Statistics Indonesia

Trends by UNDP reports

Notes

See also 

 Economy of Indonesia
 List of Indonesian provinces by GDP
 List of Indonesian provinces by GRP per capita
 List of Indonesian cities by GDP

References 

Indonesia
Human Development Index
Provinces by HDI
Human Development Index
Provinces of Indonesia by HDI
Indonesia